Langona tortuosa is a jumping spider that lives in Namibia, South Africa and Zimbabwe. It was first identified by Wanda Wesołowska in 2011.

References

Salticidae
Arthropods of Namibia
Arthropods of Zimbabwe
Spiders of South Africa
Spiders of Africa
Spiders described in 2011
Taxa named by Wanda Wesołowska